Filming permits are permits issued by governments to allow the filming of motion pictures. Every city and state has some sort of council or office that handles filming permits. Obtaining film permits is part of the process of location scouting, and they are usually the responsibility of the location manager. Permits are issued prior to the shooting with details about location, date, time, equipment, personnel, special effects, actions and stunts.

The process of applying for filming permits may include fees and often requires production insurance. Sometimes this process is handled directly by the city, and sometimes it is handled by a non-profit organization such as FilmLA in Los Angeles. In addition, each state may have its own permitting commission for state land. The process of film permitting can often make it difficult for independent and amateur filmmakers.

Filming in large cities is generally more tightly controlled. Less populated areas may waive fees or have looser requirements and regulations, either because filming is less frequent, or because they hope to attract more production.

References

Filmmaking